The Rodnover Confederation (Konfederacja Rodzimowiercza) is a confederation of Polish Rodnover religious organisations, founded on 23 August 2015 during the 3rd All-Poland Rodnover Congress in Łysogóry.

Since 2016 the Rodnover Confederation has organised the All-Poland Rodnover Congress and published the Rodnover Calendar. In May 2016, after a break of 500 years, on behalf of the Rodnover Confederation, the first celebration of the Stado festival was organised. It was the largest ceremony of this kind in the modern history of the Polish Rodnover movement.

Members
Founders:

 "Gontyna" association
 "Żertwa" association
 Pomeranian Rodnovers (later renamed to Association of Pomeranian Rodnovers "Jantar")
 Drzewo Przodków
 Krąg Radogost
 "Kałdus" association
 WiD Group
 Gromada "Swarga"
 Rodzima Wiara
 Community of Rodnovers "Watra"

Later members:

 Gromada "Wanda"

References

Religious organizations established in 2015
Modern pagan organisations based in Poland
Modern pagan organizations established in the 2010s
2015 establishments in Poland